Elizabeth Payson Prentiss (October 26, 1818 – August 13, 1878) was an American author, well known for her hymn "More Love to Thee, O Christ" and the religious novel Stepping Heavenward (1869). Her writings  enjoyed renewed popularity in the late 20th century.

Early years
Elizabeth Payson was born in Portland, Maine, United States, the fifth of eight children (only six survived infancy)  of the eminent Congregationalist pastor Edward Payson. The influences of New England Christianity, consisting of the inherited Puritan foundation with added evangelistic, missional, and philanthropic elements, were evident in the Payson family. The family gathered for prayer three times a day.
Elizabeth was deeply impacted by the death of her father, who had suffered from tuberculosis for over a year, on October 22, 1827. The family moved to New York City in 1831, and in May of that year, Elizabeth made a public profession of faith in Jesus Christ and joined the Bleecker Street Presbyterian Church.

From an early age, Elizabeth exhibited sharp mental abilities, deep and ready sympathy, and an exceptional perceptiveness. By age 16, Elizabeth had become a regular contributor of stories and poems to "The Youth's Companion," a New England religious periodical.

Career
In 1838, she opened a small girls' school in her home and took up a Sabbath-school class as well. Two years later, she left for Richmond, Virginia, to be a department head at a girls' boarding school.

In 1845, she married George Lewis Prentiss, a brother of her close friend Anna Prentiss Stearns.
The Prentisses settled in New Bedford, Massachusetts, where George became pastor of South Trinitarian Church. After a happy time of transitioning into the duties of a pastor's wife and a housewife, in 1852 she lost, within a period of three months, her second and third children – one as a newborn, one at age four.

In 1851, George Prentiss became the pastor of Mercer Street Presbyterian Church in New York City. Though Elizabeth struggled with chronic health problems, she went on to have three more healthy children. Little Little Lou's Sayings and Doings, published in 1868, included her poem "Mr. Nobody" which went on to become a children's classic. The poem is often mistakenly attributed to "anonymous" or the later poet Walter de la Mare. Her first book of stories, Little Susy's Six Birthdays, written in just ten days, was published in 1853. In 1856, following the nearly fatal illness of her daughter Minnie, she wrote the hymn "More Love to Thee."

After George Prentiss resigned from his church in New York because of failing health, the family went abroad to Europe for a couple of years. In 1860, they returned to New York, where George resumed his pastorate and held a chair at Union Theological Seminary. Stepping Heavenward, Elizabeth Prentiss's most popular book, was published in installments by the Chicago Advance in 1869.

The family eventually settled in Dorset, Vermont, where Elizabeth would die in 1878 at the age of 59. Her hymn "More Love to Thee" was sung at her funeral. After her death, George Prentiss published The Life and Letters of Elizabeth Prentiss (1882), citing his wife's words in the book's preface: "Much of my experience of life has cost me a great price and I wish to use it for strengthening and comforting other souls."

Elizabeth Prentiss had six children, of whom four survived infancy:
 Annie, b. 1845
 Eddy b. 1848 & d. 1852
 Bessie b. & d. 1852
 Minnie, a girl, b. 1854
 George, a boy, b. fall 1857
 Henry ("Swiss boy"), b. 1859

Selected works

Little Susy's Six Birthdays, 1853
Only a Dandelion, and other Stories, 1854
Henry and Bessie: or, What they did in the Country, 1855
Little Susy's Six Teachers, 1856
The Flower of the Family: A Book for Girls, 1856
Peterchen and Gretchen; or, Tales of Early Childhood, 1860
The Little Preacher, 1867
Little Threads; or, Tangle Thread, Silver Thread, and Golden Thread, 1868
Little Lou's Sayings and Doings, 1868
Fred and Maria and Me, 1868
The Old Brown Pitcher, 1868
Stepping Heavenward, 1869
Nidworth, and his three Magic Wands, 1869
The Percys, or, Ever Heavenward or, Toward Heaven or, A Mothers Influence 1870
The Story Lizzie Told, 1870
Six Little Princesses and what they turned into, 1871
Aunt Jane's Hero, 1871
Golden Hours: Hymns and Songs of the Christian Life, 1873
Aunt Jane's Hero',' 1873Urbane and His Friends, 1874Griselda: A Dramatic Poem in Five Acts, 1876 (trans. from the German by Friedrich Halm)The Home at Greylock, 1876Pemaquid; a Story of Old Times in New England, 1877Gentleman Jim, 1878Avis Benson; or, Mine and Thine, with other Sketches, 1879

References

Bibliography
James, Sharon, Elizabeth Prentiss: More Love to Thee, Carlisle, PA: Banner of Truth, 2006.
Prentiss, George Lewis, More Love to Thee: The Life and Letters of Elizabeth Prentiss'', New York: A.D. Randolph, 1882.

External links

 
 
 
 Works by Elizabeth Prentiss on Google Books

1818 births
1878 deaths
19th-century American poets
19th-century American women writers
19th-century American musicians
Writers from Portland, Maine
Poets from Maine
American Christian hymnwriters
American women poets
Songwriters from Maine
American evangelicals
Women religious writers
American women hymnwriters
American women non-fiction writers
19th-century American women musicians